Model City may refer to:

 Model city, a type of planned community
 Model City, Florida, also known as Liberty City, a neighborhood of Miami
 Model City, New York, a hamlet in Lewiston

See also
 Model (disambiguation)
 Model Town (disambiguation)
 Model village, a type of community
 Model Colony, Karachi, a neighborhood in Pakistan
 Model Housing Estate, a residential area in Hong Kong
 Miniature park, a scale model of a settlement